Mahamudra is a hatha yoga gesture (mudra) whose purpose is to improve control over the sexual potential. The sexual potential, associated with apana, is essential in the process of awakening of the dormant spiritual energy (Kundalini) and attaining of spiritual powers (siddhi).

Execution
Pressure is exerted with the heel on the perineum. This zone is considered to be closely involved in the control of the vital and sexual potential. At the same time, the throat is compressed (Jalandhara Bandha) activating the throat chakra (Vishuddha Chakra) - center of the akashic energies of void.

Effect
By activating the energies of akasha and simultaneously stimulating the energies of Muladhara Chakra, Kundalini awakens and raises through the central channel, Sushumna Nadi. The void is considered to be a substrate, an intermediary state in any transformation. Here it projects the lower energies up the spine, transforming them in spiritual energies instead. Thus Mahamudra is a gesture of alchemical transformation and elevation of the sexual potential, and at the same time a method of awakening of the supreme energy of the body, Kundalini.

Hatha Yoga Pradipika 

The Hatha Yoga Pradipika describes Mahamudra as follows:

References

Gestures
Mudras